William Barclay David Donald Turnbull (1811–63) was a Scottish antiquary, born at Edinburgh. He studied law, and was admitted as an advocate at the Scottish bar 1832, but devoted much time to the study of the antiquities and older literature of Great Britain.  In 1834, he founded the Abbotsford Club, which preserved manuscripts and old editions of written material. In 1859 he was employed by the Record Commission, but on account of his Catholicism he was attacked by the ultra-Protestant  party and compelled to resign. He was an industrious and careful editor, and did excellent service by his editions of Middle English and early modern English poetry. His work as genealogist and historical editor was of value. Among his publications may be named:  
 The Romance of Sir Guy of Warwick and Rembrun his Son (1840)  
 The Visions of Tundale (1843)  
 Letters of Mary Queen of Scots (1845)  
 The Poetical Works of William Drummond of Hawthornden (1856)
 

19th-century Scottish historians
Scottish antiquarians
English genealogists
1811 births
1863 deaths
Writers from Edinburgh